Airship (formerly Urban Airship) is an American company that provides marketing and branding services. Airship allows companies to generate custom messages to consumers via push notifications, SMS messaging, and similar, and provides customer analytics services.

History
In 2009, Airship was founded by Steven Osborn, Scott Kveton, Adam Lowry, and Michael Richardson. The company received $1.1 million in Series A funding in February 2010, and then received $5.4 million in Series B funding in November of the same year. On November 5, 2011 Airship received $15.1 million in Series C funding from Salesforce.com, Intel, and Verizon, among others.

In 2011, Airship acquired SimpleGeo on October 31, 2011.  SimpleGeo developed toolsets allowing developers to more easily create location aware mobile applications and had partnered with Airship to combine software and services shortly before their acquisition. Airship discontinued SimpleGeo services on March 31, 2012.

In December 2012, Airship acquired Tello, another True Ventures-backed startup. Airship acquired Tello in an all-stock deal in order to integrate PassTools, Tello's Apple Passbook management product, into its current offering.

On February 6, 2013 the company announced additional funding of $25 million from Foundry Group, Intel Capital, True Ventures and Verizon. In October 2014 the company announced another $12.1 million in Series D funding from existing investors. In February 2015 the company picked up an additional $9 million in venture funding, bringing total funding to $67.6 million.  In June 2018 the company completed an F round of funding at $25 million led by Foundry Group.

In July 2014, Scott Kveton stepped down as CEO. In October of that same year Brett Caine was hired as CEO. Caine was previously the president of Citrix Online. In November 2016, Airship launched two messaging APIs Open Channels and Open Profiles. In September 2018, Airship released beta SDK for iOS.

In June 2019, the company rebranded as Airship (formally being Urban Airship)

In September 2020, Airship acquired SMS commerce company ReplyBuy for an undisclosed amount. The ReplyBuy team will be joining Airship with CEO Brandon O'Hallary becoming Airship's general manager of commerce and CTO Anthony Saia heading the commerce engineering team.

, Airship has offices in Portland OR, San Francisco, Santa Barbara, New York City, London, Paris, New Delhi, Munich and Singapore.

References

External links

 

2009 establishments in Oregon
Companies based in Portland, Oregon
American companies established in 2009
Mobile technology companies
Privately held companies based in Oregon
Software companies based in Oregon
Software companies of the United States
Software companies established in 2009